Xerocrassa zaharensis is a species of air-breathing land snail, a pulmonate gastropod mollusk in the family Geomitridae.

Distribution

This species is endemic to Spain, where it is only known from its type locality in Zahara de la Sierra, Cádiz.

References

 Puente, A. I. & Arrébola, J. R. (1996). Deux espèces nouvelles Trochoidea (Xerocrassa) du sud de la péninsule Ibérique (Pulmonata, Helicoidae, Hygromiidae). Bulletin du Muséum National d'Histoire Naturelle, Zoologie. 18 (12): 55-67
 Bank, R. A.; Neubert, E. (2017). Checklist of the land and freshwater Gastropoda of Europe. Last update: July 16th, 2017

External links

zaharensis
Molluscs of Europe
Endemic fauna of Spain
Gastropods described in 1996